Bhale Basava is a 1969 Indian Kannada-language film, directed and produced by B. S. Ranga. The film stars Udaykumar, Rajesh, V. Nagayya and Narasimharaju. The film has musical score by S. Rajeshwara Rao.

Cast

Udaykumar
Rajesh
V. Nagayya
Narasimharaju
Raghavendra Rao
Nagappa
Nagesh
Maniyam
Udayashankar
Jayanthi
Rajasree
Premalatha
Papamma
Ramadevi
Sadhana
Mysore Lakshmi
Jyothilakshmi
Shakunthala

References

External links
 

1969 films
1960s Kannada-language films
Films directed by B. S. Ranga